19th Division or 19th Infantry Division may refer to:

Infantry divisions
 19th Division (German Empire)
 19th Infantry Division (Bangladesh)
 19th Ersatz Division (German Empire)
 19th Waffen Grenadier Division of the SS (2nd Latvian)
 19th Infantry Division (India)
 19th Infantry Division Venezia (Kingdom of Italy)
 19th Division (Imperial Japanese Army)
 19th Division (North Korea)
 19th Infantry Division (Ottoman Empire)
 19th Infantry Division (Poland)
 19th Rifle Division (Soviet Union)
 19th (Western) Division (United Kingdom)
 19th Infantry Division (United States)

Motorized infantry divisions
 19th Mechanized Division (Greece)
 19th Motor Rifle Division (Soviet Union)

Armoured divisions
 19th Panzer Division (Germany)
 19th Guards Tank Division (Soviet Army)
 19th Armored Division (United States)

Aviation divisions
 19th Air Division (United States)

See also 
 19th Corps (disambiguation)
 19th Brigade (disambiguation)
 19th Regiment (disambiguation)
 19th Group (disambiguation)
 19th Battalion (disambiguation)
 19th Squadron (disambiguation)